Mieko Takizawa  was a Japanese novelist. She was best known for her 1989 work , which won the Akutagawa Prize.

Biography 
Takizawa was born Mieko Okamoto in Niigata prefecture, Japan on March 1, 1939. She studied Chinese at the Tokyo University of Foreign Studies, but did not graduate. Instead, she worked a few part-time jobs before being hired for a position at Marsh McLennan. She married Atsushi Takizawa in 1980, and left her job to become a housewife. She began writing at this time.

Takizawa died on August 9, 2020.

Critical reception 
Researcher Sachiko Schierbeck wrote that Takizawa's stories deal with the contradictory nature of human life, and observes them without judgement. She notes, however, that some of Takizawa's characters strain the suspension of disbelief.

Selected works 

 , 1989
 , 1991
 , 1995
 , 1995

References 

1939 births
2020 deaths
20th-century Japanese novelists
People from Niigata Prefecture
Akutagawa Prize winners